These are the Billboard Hot Dance/Disco Club Play and 12 Inch Singles Sales number-one hits of 1990.

See also
1990 in music
List of number-one dance hits (United States)
List of artists who reached number one on the U.S. Dance chart

References

1990
United States Dance singles
1990 in American music